Albert Lovejoy Gutterson (August 23, 1887 – April 7, 1965) was an American athlete who won a gold medal in the long jump at the 1912 Summer Olympics. Gutterson also set a new Olympic record of 7.60 meters at this event.

Gutterson was a native of Springfield, VT and attended the University of Vermont where he was a standout in track and field. He is Vermont's first and only gold medalist in the Summer Olympics. The university's athletic complex, Gutterson Fieldhouse, home to the Catamount men's and women's hockey teams is named after him. Sports Illustrated ranked him fifth on its Top 50 Vermont athletes of the 20th century, and he is an original inductee of the University of Vermont Hall of Fame and Vermont Sports Hall of Fame. In 1963, Vermont dedicated the Albert Gutterson Field House in his honor.

Gutterson was an engineer by education. He worked for the Jones and Lamson Machine Co. and then, in 1925–1950, in the petroleum industry. From 1950 to 1963, he served as president of Lovejoy Tool Company, which was founded by his uncle.

References

External links

Profile on databaseOlympics.com
 Vermont Sports Hall of Fame Bio

1887 births
1965 deaths
American male long jumpers
Olympic gold medalists for the United States in track and field
Athletes (track and field) at the 1912 Summer Olympics
People from Windsor County, Vermont
University of Vermont alumni
Sportspeople from Vermont
Medalists at the 1912 Summer Olympics